Move by Yourself is the title of Donavon Frankenreiter's second album, released on June 6, 2006 (see 2006 in music).

Track listing
"Move by Yourself" – 5:16
"The Way It Is" – 3:49
"By Your Side" – 4:36
"These Arms" (Donavon Frankenreiter, Matt Grundy)  – 2:59
"Let It Go" – 4:11
"Fool" – 6:01
"Everytime" – 3:24
"That's Too Bad (Byron Jam)" – 2:42
"Girl Like You" – 3:07
"All Around Us" – 4:51
"Beautiful Day" – 3:26
All songs written by Donavon Frankenreiter except where indicated.

Personnel
Donavon Frankenreiter - Guitar, Producer, Audio Production, Vocals, Composer
Patrick Evan Mcmillan - Vocals (Background)
Neil Pogue - Producer, Mixing
Benjamin Wright - Strings, String Arrangements
Jimmy Hill - Vocals (Background)
Cherokee - Vocals (Background)
Eric Brigmond - Keyboards
Scott Soens - Photography
Eulene Sherman - Vocals (Background)
AVOP - Vocals (Background)
Craig Barnette - Percussion, Drums
Chad Early - Art Direction
Tom Haller - Percussion
Saboria Lamar Napolean - Vocals (Background)
Kizzime Walkers - Vocals (Background)
Matt Grundy - Composer, Guitar (Bass), Vocals (Background)
Kim Buie - A&R
Jim DeVito - Engineer
Brian Gardner - Mastering

Charts

Certifications

References 

2006 albums
Donavon Frankenreiter albums